Tabernaemontana glandulosa is a species of plant in the family Apocynaceae. It is found from Guinea to West Congo.

References

glandulosa